Janis Ringhand (born February 13, 1950) is a member of the Wisconsin State Senate from Evansville, Wisconsin. An accountant and former director of a non-profit, she previously served in the Wisconsin State Assembly.

Ringhand graduated from Madison Area Technical College in 1985, and served as the Mayor of Evansville from 2002 to 2006. A Democrat, Ringhand was elected to the  Assembly in 2010, unseating Republican incumbent Amy Loudenbeck, and re-elected in 2012.

In 2014, with the announced retirement of state senator Tim Cullen, Ringhand ran for Cullen's seat rather than seek re-election to the Assembly. She won the Democratic primary election in August, with 6,157 votes to 5,883 for former Cullen aide Austin Scieszinski and 3,448 for former Assembly Speaker Michael J. Sheridan. On November 4, 2014, Ringhand was elected to the Wisconsin State Senate.

References 

American accountants
Women accountants
1950 births
Living people
Madison Area Technical College alumni
Mayors of places in Wisconsin
Democratic Party Wisconsin state senators
People from Evansville, Wisconsin
Women state legislators in Wisconsin
21st-century American politicians
21st-century American women politicians
Democratic Party members of the Wisconsin State Assembly